John Paul Berry (January 17, 1918 – November 3, 1970) was an American baseball pitcher and first baseman in the Negro leagues. Berry played on the Kansas City Monarchs barnstorming team in 1935 and 1936, and briefly joined the club in 1945.

References 

Kansas City Monarchs players
1918 births
1970 deaths
Baseball pitchers
Baseball first basemen
20th-century African-American sportspeople